The Armenian Kingdom of Cilicia was a state formed in the Middle Ages by Armenian refugees, who were fleeing the Seljuk invasion of Armenia. It was initially founded by the Rubenian dynasty, an offshoot of the larger Bagratid family that at various times held the thrones of Armenia and Georgia. While the Rubenian rulers were initially regional princes, their close ties with the Western world after the First Crusade saw the principality recognised as a kingdom under Leo I by the Holy Roman Empire in 1198. The Rubenid dynasty fell in 1252 after the death of the last Rubenid monarch Isabella, and her husband Hethum I became sole ruler, beginning the Hethumid dynasty. After the death of Leo IV in 1341 his cousin was elected to succeed him as Constantine II, the first king of the Lusignan dynasty. The kingdom fell at the beginning of Leo V's reign to the Mamluks, and henceforth title holders were only claimants to the throne. Charlotte of Cyprus ceded the throne to the House of Savoy in 1485, and the title fell out of use until after 1861.

Lords/princes

Kings and queens

Claimants

Potential claimants today
The claim to the title passed to the House of Savoy, who were granted it by Charlotte in 1485. The Savoyard dynasts maintained their claim to the title "King of Cyprus, Jerusalem and Armenia" as late as the 20th century.

Notes

References
 
 
 Histoire des Princes de Lusignan, Anciens Rois de Jérusalem, de la Petite Arménie et de Chypre, St. Petersbourg: Soikine, 1903.

Armenia, Cilicia

Lists of Armenian people
Middle Ages-related lists 
Lists of medieval people
Lists of nobility of the Crusader states